The Pratt & Whitney R-985 Wasp Junior is a series of nine-cylinder, air-cooled, radial aircraft engines built by the Pratt & Whitney Aircraft Company from the 1930s to the 1950s.

Wasp Juniors have powered numerous smaller civil and military aircraft, including small transports, utility aircraft, trainers, agricultural aircraft, and helicopters. Over 39,000 engines were built, and many are still in service today.

Design and development
Pratt & Whitney developed the R-985 Wasp Junior as a smaller version of the R-1340 Wasp to compete in the market for medium-sized aircraft engines. Like its larger brother, the Wasp Junior was an air-cooled, nine-cylinder radial, with its power boosted by a gear-driven single-speed centrifugal type supercharger. The Wasp Junior used many parts from the Wasp and even had the same mounting dimensions, allowing an aircraft to easily use either the smaller or the larger engine. The first run of the Wasp Junior was in 1929, and sales began in 1930. The initial version, the Wasp Junior A, produced .

The U.S. military designated the Wasp Junior as the R-985, with various suffixes denoting different military engine models. However, Pratt & Whitney never adopted the R-985 designation scheme for its civilian Wasp Juniors, identifying them simply by name and model (e.g. "Wasp Junior A").

Pratt & Whitney followed the Wasp Junior A with more powerful models in the "A series". These had higher compression ratios, greater RPM limits, and more effective supercharging, and they led to the "B series". The first B series model was the Wasp Junior TB, which could maintain  at sea level and could reach  for takeoff. A still later model, the Wasp Junior T1B2, had improved performance at low level, being able to sustain  up to  while still matching the SB's power at high altitudes. The SB and T1B2, and later versions of these with similar performance, were the most popular Wasp Junior models. One later development of the T1B2, the Wasp Junior B4, was especially designed for vertical mounting in helicopters.

During the mid-1930s, Pratt & Whitney developed a still greater improvement of the Wasp Junior, the "C series", with an even higher compression ratio and RPM limit. It also included reduction gearing to allow the high-revving engine to drive a propeller at suitable speeds, hence the "-G" suffix. Aviator Jacqueline Cochran flew a special Model D-17W Beechcraft Staggerwing with this engine in 1937, setting a speed and altitude record and placing third in the Bendix transcontinental race. However, the SC-G never got past the experimental stage.

Operational history
Early versions of the Wasp Junior were used in various small civilian and military utility aircraft, but only in limited numbers.  The type became more popular later in the 1930s. It was selected for the Lockheed Model 10A Electra twin-engined airliner, as well as for other small twin-engined civil transports like the Lockheed Model 12A Electra Junior, the Beechcraft Model 18, and the Grumman Goose amphibious aircraft. It was also used in single-engined civilian utility aircraft like the Beechcraft Staggerwing, the Howard DGA-15, and the Spartan Executive.

As World War II arrived, the U.S. military chose the Wasp Junior for the Vultee BT-13 Valiant and North American BT-14 basic training aircraft and for the Vought OS2U Kingfisher observation floatplane. Military versions of existing Wasp Junior-powered civilian aircraft were also produced, such as the military derivatives of the Beech 18, Beech Staggerwing, Grumman Goose, and Howard DGA-15. The Wasp Junior also powered some versions of the British Avro Anson and Airspeed Oxford twin-engined trainers. The demands of World War II led to the production of many thousands of Wasp Juniors.

Until the end of the war, the Wasp Junior's closest competitor was Wright Aeronautical's R-975 Whirlwind. However, during the war, the Wasp Junior was far more widely used in aircraft than the R-975, and Wright ceased production of the R-975 in 1945.

After World War II, many military-surplus aircraft with Wasp Junior engines entered the civilian market. New designs based on the Wasp Junior were also introduced, such as the Sikorsky H-5 helicopter, the de Havilland Canada DHC-2 Beaver, and Max Holste Broussard bush airplanes, and agricultural aircraft such as the Snow S-2B and S-2C, Grumman Ag Cat, and Weatherley 201.

Pratt & Whitney ceased production of the Wasp Junior in 1953, having built 39,037 engines. Many Wasp Junior engines are still in use today in older bush planes and agricultural planes, as well as in antique aircraft. Some antique aircraft, such as the Boeing-Stearman Model 75, which originally used other engines, have had them replaced with the Wasp Junior to provide more power or for easier maintenance, since parts for the Wasp Junior are readily available.

Variants
Wasp Junior A
U.S. military version: R-985-1
 at 2,000 RPM at sea level and for takeoff. First production version.
Wasp Junior S2A
Wasp Junior TB, TB2
U.S. military versions: R-985-9, -11, -11A, -21, -46
 at 2,200 RPM at sea level,  at 2,300 RPM for takeoff. Early B-series versions rated for sea-level performance.
Wasp Junior SB, SB2, SB3
U.S. military versions: R-985-13, -17, -23, -33, -48, -50; R-985-AN-2, -4, -6, -6B, -8, -10, -12, -12B, -14B
Common B-series versions were rated for performance at altitude.
Wasp Junior T1B2, T1B3
U.S. military versions: R-985-25, -27, -39, -39A; R-985-AN-1, -1A, -3, -3A
Common B-series versions with improved sea-level performance
Wasp Junior B4
U.S. military versions: R-985-AN-5, -7.
Wasp Junior SC-G

Applications

 Airspeed Oxford (AS.46 Oxford V)
 Air Tractor AT-300
 Avro Anson (Mk V)
 Barkley-Grow T8P-1
 Beechcraft Model 18 and military derivatives
 Beechcraft Staggerwing D17S, D17W, G17S
 Bell XV-3
 Bellanca 300-W
 Berliner-Joyce OJ
 Boeing-Stearman Model 75 (in aftermarket conversions)
 Bratukhin G-3
 CAC Winjeel
 de Havilland Canada DHC-2 Beaver and L-20/U-6 military versions
 Douglas C-26 Dolphin
 Fleetwings BT-12
 Gee Bee Model Z
 Grumman G-164 Ag Cat (some models)
 Grumman G-21 Goose
 Howard DGA-11
 Howard DGA-15P
 Junkers F13 (Rimowa F13 replica)
 Koolhoven F.K.51 (some models)
 Laird Solution (LC-DW Solution, LC-DW300 Super Solution)
 Lockheed Model 10-A Electra
 Lockheed Model 12-A Electra Junior
 Max Holste MH.1521 Broussard
 McDonnell XHJH Whirlaway
 Naval Aircraft Factory N3N (in aftermarket conversions) 
 North American BT-14 
 PWS-24bis
 Seversky BT-8
 Sikorsky H-5 helicopter (and S-51 civil version)
 Sikorsky S-39 amphibian
 Snow S-2B and S-2C
 SIAI-Marchetti SM.102
 Spartan Executive 7W
 Stinson Reliant SR-9F and SR-10F
 Vought OS2U Kingfisher
 Vultee BT-13 Valiant
 Waco S3HD
 Waco SRE Aristocrat
 Weatherly 201 series
 Weatherly 620
 Wedell-Williams Model 44

Engines on display

Some museums which have Wasp Junior engines on display:
 The National Air and Space Museum's Steven F. Udvar-Hazy Center near Washington Dulles International Airport in Virginia: This engine has been sectioned and motorized for display.
 EAA AirVenture Museum in Oshkosh, Wisconsin
 Hill Aerospace Museum near Ogden, Utah.
 Museum of Flight in Seattle, Washington
 National Museum of Naval Aviation near Pensacola, Florida
 National Museum of the United States Air Force near Dayton, Ohio
 New England Air Museum in Windsor Locks, Connecticut
 Pima Air & Space Museum in Tucson, Arizona
 Southern Museum of Flight in Birmingham, Alabama.
 Strategic Air and Space Museum (formerly the Strategic Air Command Museum) near Ashland, Nebraska
 Canada Aviation and Space Museum in Ottawa, Ontario
 Royal Air Force Museum Cosford, near Wolverhampton, United Kingdom
 Queensland Air Museum in Caloundra, Queensland.

Specifications (R-985 Wasp Junior SB)

See also

References

Notes

Bibliography
Gunston, Bill. World Encyclopedia of Aero Engines: From the Pioneers to the Present Day. 5th edition, Stroud, UK: Sutton, 2006.
White, Graham. Allied Aircraft Piston Engines of World War II: History and Development of Frontline Aircraft Piston Engines Produced by Great Britain and the United States During World War II. Warrendale, Pennsylvania: SAE International, 1995. 
 . Available from the Aircraft Engine Historical Society's reference page.
 
The following Federal Aviation Administration type certificate data sheets, all available from the FAA's Regulatory and Guidance Library:
Wasp Jr. A: .
Wasp Jr. SB, T1B2, B4: .
Wasp Jr. TB: .
Wasp Jr. military models: .

External links

1920s aircraft piston engines
Aircraft air-cooled radial piston engines
R-985